The Dutch Tourist Trophy, also known as the TT Assen, is an annual Dutch motorsport event established in 1925 for road racing motorcycles held on the TT Circuit Assen, also known as the ‘Cathedral of Speed'. The event attained world championship status in 1949 when it was sanctioned by the FIM as part of the inaugural Grand Prix motorcycle racing world championship season, making it the oldest event on the MotoGP calendar. The venue holds the record for being the only circuit to have hosted a motorcycle Grand Prix event every year since the series was created in 1949, with the exception of 2020 when the race was cancelled due to the outbreak of COVID-19. The races were traditionally held on the last Saturday of June however, from 2016 onwards it has been held on Sunday of the last weekend of June, bringing it in line with all other MotoGP races. The event is due to take place at the TT Circuit Assen until at least 2026.

Race history
After the Dutch government relaxed laws allowing the motorsport racing on public roads, the Assen & Omstreken motorcycle club organized and held the first Dutch TT on July 11, 1925. Since then the event has taken place every year with the exception of the years 1940 to 1945 because of the Second World War. The 1925 races were held on a  street circuit in the shape of a triangle between the towns of Borger, Schoonloo and Grolloo. From 1926 to 1955, the races were held on a  rectangular shaped street circuit through the towns of De Haar, Hooghalen, Laaghalen and Laaghalerveen. In 1955, a new  circuit was created which still used public roads but, more closely resembled a modern race track. In 1992, the race track became a permanent enclosed circuit.

Official names and sponsors
1949–1957, 1959–1971: Grote Prijs van Nederland der K.N.M.V. (no official sponsor)
1972, 1981–1985, 1992: Dutch TT Assen (no official sponsor)
1973–1977: Dutch TT Assen/Grote Prijs van Nederland der KNMV (no official sponsor)
1978–1980, 1986–1991: Dutch TT (no official sponsor)
1993–1997: Lucky Strike Dutch Grand Prix
1998–2000: Rizla+ Dutch TT
2001–2003: Gauloises Dutch TT
2004–2005: Gauloises TT Assen
2006–2008: A-Style TT Assen
2009: Alice TT Assen
2010: TIM TT Assen
2011–2013: Iveco TT Assen
2014: Iveco Daily TT Assen
2015–2019, 2021–present: Motul TT Assen

Spectator attendance

2007: 91,429

2013: 90,000

2016–2019: 105,000

Winners of the motorcycle Dutch TT

Multiple winners (riders)

Multiple winners (manufacturers)

Winners by season

References

 
Recurring sporting events established in 1949
1949 establishments in the Netherlands